Senad Brkić (born 3 September 1969) is a Bosnian former professional footballer and current football manager who is in charge of the Čelika Zenica under-19 team.

Playing career

Club
In his career Brkić played for Bosnian club Čelik Zenica on two occasions (1988–1994 ; 2000–2006), Croatian club Rijeka (1994–1998) and Turkish club Altay  (1998–2000). He left the biggest mark at Rijeka and Čelik, scoring 33 goals for each club in 90 and 69 matches for both of them respectevly. At Čelik, Brkić is considered as a club legend and is one of the top scorers in its history.

International
Brkić earned 7 caps for the Bosnia and Herzegovina national team between 1996 and 2002. His first match for the national team was on 6 November 1996 against Italy in a 1–2 win, while his last match for the national team was on 7 September 2002 against Romania in a European Championship qualification 0–3 loss.

Managerial career
Brkić started his managerial career in 2014 as a youth coach at Čelik. He stayed on that position until 2016, after which he got appointed as an assistant manager to Elvedin Beganović in the first team of the club. In March 2017, he again became an assistant manager in the first team, this time to Boris Pavić.

From July 2017 to 31 December 2018, Brkić was the manager of the under-17 team of Čelik Zenica. On 29 June 2019, he became the new manager of the under-19 team of the club.

Career statistics

Club
Source:

International

International goals
(Bosnia and Herzegovina score listed first, score column indicates score after each Brkić goal)

References

External links

1969 births
Living people
People from Busovača
Association football forwards
Yugoslav footballers
Bosnia and Herzegovina footballers
Bosnia and Herzegovina international footballers
NK Čelik Zenica players
HNK Rijeka players
Altay S.K. footballers
Yugoslav First League players
Yugoslav Second League players
Croatian Football League players
Süper Lig players
Premier League of Bosnia and Herzegovina players
Bosnia and Herzegovina expatriate footballers
Expatriate footballers in Croatia
Bosnia and Herzegovina expatriate sportspeople in Croatia
Expatriate footballers in Turkey
Bosnia and Herzegovina expatriate sportspeople in Turkey
Bosnia and Herzegovina football managers